Estadio Mendocino de Hockey is a field hockey stadium in Mendoza, Argentina. It was specifically built to host the 2013 Women's Pan American Cup, with a capacity of 3,400 with mobile grandstands. It was also the venue for the 2014 Women's Hockey Champions Trophy.

References

Field hockey venues in Argentina
2013 establishments in Argentina